Brachmia officiosa is a moth in the family Gelechiidae. It was described by Edward Meyrick in 1918. It is found in southern India.

The wingspan is about 12 mm. The forewings are light fuscous, with the basal third of the costa suffused with dark fuscous. The stigmata is blackish, the plical beneath the first discal and there is a small cloudy blackish spot on the dorsum towards the tornus, as well as some small groups of blackish scales along thetermen. The hindwings are grey.

References

Moths described in 1918
Brachmia
Taxa named by Edward Meyrick
Moths of Asia